USS PGM-6 was a PGM-1 class motor gunboat that served in the United States Navy during World War II.  She was originally laid down as a SC-497 class submarine chaser on 6 February 1943 by the Mathis Yacht Building Company in Camden, New Jersey and launched on 20 May 1943.  She was commissioned as USS SC-1071 on 8 June 1943.  She was later converted to a PGM-1 class motor gunboat and renamed PGM-6 on 10 December 1943.  During the war she took part in the Pacific Theater.  After the war she was transferred to the Foreign Liquidations Commission on 7 May 1947.  Her exact fate is unknown.

References
Motor Gunboat/Patrol Gunboat Photo Archive: PGM-6
USS SC-1071 (SC-1071)
see PGM-3 for service details

PGM-1-class motor gunboats
Ships built by the Mathis Yacht Building Company
1943 ships
World War II gunboats of the United States